Liberia is a country on the West African coast. Liberia means "Land of the Free" in Latin. The Central Bank of Liberia is responsible for printing and maintaining the Liberian dollar, which is the primary form of currency in Liberia.
Liberia is one of the world's poorest countries, with a formal employment rate of 15%.  GDP per capita peaked in 1980 at US$496, when it was comparable to Egypt's (at the time). In 2011, the country's nominal GDP was US$1.154 billion, while nominal GDP per capita stood at US$297, the third-lowest in the world. Historically, the Liberian economy has depended heavily on foreign aid, foreign direct investment and exports of natural resources such as iron ore, rubber and timber.

Notable firms 
This list includes notable companies with primary headquarters located in the country. The industry and sector follow the Industry Classification Benchmark taxonomy. Organizations which have ceased operations are included and noted as defunct.

See also 
 Liberian companies

References 

 
Liberia